Tanha, Thanha or Thanhha may refer to

Culture and media
 Taṇhā, a concept in Buddhism referring to thirst, desire, and greed
Thanha Rathi Ranga, a 2014 Sri Lankan thriller film
Tanha (TV series), an Indian television drama which aired in 1997-1999

People
Thanhha Lai (born 1965), Vietnam-born American writer
Abbas Saeidi Tanha (born 1981), Iranian cyclist

Villages in Iran
Tanha Kola, Amol
Tanha Kola, Babol

See also
Tana (disambiguation)
Tanaji, an Indian name